The Pepperell Center Historic District encompasses the historic core of the village center of Pepperell, Massachusetts.  The district is based around the town common, which was laid out in 1740, along with the construction of the first church (whose location is demarcated by foundation lines).  It includes a number of surviving 18th century structures, including a post office building that is now a private home, and the town's oldest cemeteries.  The village radiates away from the common along Park, Main, Elm, Townsend and Heald Streets.

The district was added to the National Register of Historic Places in 1994.

See also
National Register of Historic Places listings in Middlesex County, Massachusetts

References

External links
 Pepperell Center Historic District -- Pepperell Historical Commission

Historic districts in Middlesex County, Massachusetts
National Register of Historic Places in Middlesex County, Massachusetts
Historic districts on the National Register of Historic Places in Massachusetts